Metamya is a genus of moths in the subfamily Arctiinae. The genus was described by Travassos in 1946.

Species
 Metamya aenetus (Schaus, 1896)
 Metamya bricenoi Rothschild, 1911
 Metamya chrysonota Hampson, 1898
 Metamya flavia Schaus, 1898
 Metamya picta Druce, 1895
 Metamya intersecta Hampson, 1898

References

External links

Arctiinae